Nullable types are a feature of some programming languages which allow a value to be set to the special value NULL instead of the usual possible values of the data type. In statically typed languages, a nullable type is an option type, while in dynamically typed languages (where values have types, but variables do not), equivalent behavior is provided by having a single null value.

NULL is frequently used to represent a missing value or invalid value, such as from a function that failed to return or a missing field in a database, as in NULL in SQL. In other words NULL is undefined.

Primitive types such as integers and Booleans cannot generally be null, but the corresponding nullable types (nullable integer and nullable Boolean, respectively) can also assume the NULL value. This can be represented in ternary logic as FALSE,NULL,TRUE as in three-valued logic.

Example
An integer variable may represent integers, but 0 (zero) is a special case because 0 in many programming languages can mean "false". Also this doesn't give us any notion of saying that the variable is empty, a need for which occurs in many circumstances. This need can be achieved with a nullable type. In programming languages like C# 2.0, a nullable integer, for example, can be declared by a question mark (int? x).  In programming languages like C# 1.0, nullable types can be defined by an external library as new types (e.g. NullableInteger, NullableBoolean).

A Boolean variable makes the effect more clear. Its values can be either "true" or "false", while a nullable boolean may also contain a representation for "undecided". However, the interpretation or treatment of a logical operation involving such a variable depends on the language.

Compared with null pointers
In contrast, object pointers can be set to NULL by default in most common languages, meaning that the pointer or reference points to nowhere, that no object is assigned (the variable does not point to any object).
Nullable references were invented by C. A. R. Hoare in 1965 as part of the Algol W language.  Hoare later described his invention as a "billion-dollar mistake".  This is because object pointers that can be NULL require the user to check the pointer before using it and require specific code to handle the case when the object pointer is NULL. 

Java has classes that correspond to scalar values, such as Integer, Boolean and Float.  Combined with autoboxing (automatic usage-driven conversion between object and value), this effectively allows nullable variables for scalar values.

Compared with option types
Nullable type implementations usually adhere to the null object pattern.

There is a more general and formal concept that extend the nullable type concept, it comes from option types, which enforce explicit handling of the exceptional case.

Language support
The following programming languages support nullable types.

Statically typed languages with native null support include:
 Ballerina  
C#
 Dart
 Kotlin  
 Swift  
 Ceylon
 SQL
 SAS (Missing values)

Statically typed languages with library null support include:
 C# (since version 2)
 Delphi
 Free Pascal
 VB.NET
 Java (since version 8)
 Scala
 Oxygene
 F#
 Statically typed CLI languages

Dynamically-typed languages with null include:
 Perl scalar variables default to undef and can be set to undef.
 PHP with NULL type and is_null() method, native nullable type in version 7.1 
 Python has the None value.
 Julia has the nothing value (which is of type Nothing) and the Union{T, Nothing} type idiom.
 Ruby with nil value and NilClass type.
 JavaScript has a null value

See also
 Null coalescing operator
 Semipredicate problem
 Union type
 Unit type

References

Type theory